Jens Lindhardt (born 23 September 1946) is a Danish rower. He competed in the men's coxed four event at the 1972 Summer Olympics.

References

1946 births
Living people
Danish male rowers
Olympic rowers of Denmark
Rowers at the 1972 Summer Olympics
Rowers from Copenhagen